The 2019 Frisco Bowl was a college football bowl game played on December 20, 2019, with kickoff at 7:30 p.m. EST (6:30 p.m. local CST) on ESPN2. It was the 3rd edition of the Frisco Bowl, and one of the 2019–20 bowl games concluding the 2019 FBS football season. Sponsored by restaurant franchise Tropical Smoothie Cafe, the game was officially known as the Tropical Smoothie Cafe Frisco Bowl.

Teams
The bowl matched the Utah State Aggies of the Mountain West Conference and Kent State Golden Flashes of the Mid-American Conference (MAC). This was the teams' third meeting; the all-time series had been tied at 1–1.  Their most recent meeting had seen Utah State defeat Kent State by a score of 27–24 on October 19, 1974, at Kent State.

Utah State Aggies

Utah State completed their regular season with a 7–5 record (6–2 in conference), finishing in third place in the Mountain Division of Mountain West. This was the Aggies' 13th bowl game in program history, and eighth bowl appearance in nine seasons.

Kent State Golden Flashes

Kent State finished their regular season at 6–6 (5–3 in conference), in a three-way tie for second place in the East Division of the MAC. This was the fourth bowl game in school history, as the Golden Flashes were seeking their first-ever bowl win after losing the previous three.  It was also Kent State's first bowl game since the 2013 GoDaddy.com Bowl, where their 2012 team lost to Arkansas State, 17–13.

Game summary

Statistics

References

External links

Box score at ESPN
Game statistics at statbroadcast.com

Frisco Bowl
Frisco Bowl
Frisco Bowl
Frisco Bowl
Kent State Golden Flashes football bowl games
Utah State Aggies football bowl games